Ian Stuart (born 8 October 1961) is a Canadian rugby union player. He played in 21 matches for the Canada national rugby union team from 1984 to 1994, including three matches at the 1987 Rugby World Cup.

References

1961 births
Living people
Canadian rugby union players
Canada international rugby union players
Place of birth missing (living people)